Socialist Alternative is a socialist group in Canada active in youth and student activities, unions, environmental movements, and campaigns for economic and social justice. Socialist Alternative works under the belief that capitalism is incapable of providing a society wherein the majority thrive.

The group was founded as Labour Militant in 1986, a faction within the New Democratic Party of Canada (NDP). It withdrew from the NDP in 1996 and called instead for the creation of a new workers' party due to the drift of the NDP and other social democratic parties around the world towards liberal policies, particularly the Third Way and Blairism as inspired by then British Labour Party leader Tony Blair. Labour Militant changed its name to Socialist Resistance before adopting the name Socialist Alternative in 1999

In British Columbia, Socialist Alternative has endorsed the BC Federation of Labour's "Fight for 15" campaign for a $15 minimum wage and works actively on this campaign.

It works closely with Alternative Socialiste in Quebec and is affiliated with International Socialist Alternative, an international socialist organization. The ISA section in the United States, which has the same name, has attracted some attention with the election victory in Seattle of Socialist Alternative city councillor Kshama Sawant in 2013.

Political views

References

Far-left politics in Canada
Canada
Trotskyist organizations in Canada